Tiunovskaya is a rural locality (a village) in Tarnogskoye Rural Settlement, Tarnogsky District, Vologda Oblast, Russia. The population was 65 as of 2002.

Geography 
Tiunovskaya is located 14 km southeast of Tarnogsky Gorodok (the district's administrative centre) by road. Kokorikha is the nearest rural locality.

References 

Rural localities in Tarnogsky District